Saint Leo University is a private Roman Catholic liberal arts university in St. Leo, Florida. It was established in 1889. The university is associated with the Holy Name Monastery, a Benedictine convent, and Saint Leo Abbey, a Benedictine monastery. The university and the abbey are both named for Pope Leo the Great, bishop of Rome from 440 to 461. The name also honors Leo XIII, who was Pope at the time, and Leo Haid, then abbot of Maryhelp Abbey in North Carolina, now Belmont Abbey, who participated in founding the university and served as its first president.

The first Roman Catholic college in Florida, Saint Leo is one of the five largest Catholic colleges in the United States. It enrolls students at the traditional University Campus, at more than 40 education centers and offices, and through its Center for Online Learning. University-wide, Saint Leo educates students from all 50 states, the District of Columbia, three U.S. territories, and more than 80 countries. As of Spring 2017, total enrollment was 16,207 students, with 2,088 of those at University Campus.

Saint Leo was one of the first American universities to provide distance learning opportunities to students, beginning with educating military men and women in 1973 during the Vietnam era at the height of the anti-war movement. Saint Leo University offers more than 40 associate, baccalaureate, and master's degrees, and certificate programs and inaugurated its first doctoral program in 2013. As of Fall 2016, the faculty included 219 full-time faculty and 1,157 fully qualified adjunct faculty members. In 2020, they had approximately 2000 employees.

History

Saint Leo traces its history to August 10, 1881, when Edmund F. Dunne, a former chief justice of the Arizona Territory, gained control of 100,000 acres in Florida. He established a Roman Catholic colony in an area that is now the city of San Antonio and the town of St. Leo.

To accommodate a number of German-speaking colonists, Bishop John Moore of the Diocese of St. Augustine wrote the abbot of Saint Vincent Archabbey in Latrobe, Pennsylvania to request a German-speaking priest. That request led to the Benedictine monks first arriving in the area. In 1888, Saint Vincent Archabbey transferred control of the colony to Mary Help of Christians Abbey (commonly called Maryhelp) in Belmont, North Carolina.

In February 1889, Abbot Leo Haid, OSB, of Maryhelp Abbey accepted a gift from Edmund Dunne of 36 acres on Lake Jovita for the founding of a Benedictine College. That same month, Benedictine nuns arrived from Allegheny, Pennsylvania.

On March 11, 1889, they founded Holy Name Monastery. Saint Leo College and Saint Leo Abbey were founded on June 4, 1889. St. Leo College, the original name of the institution, opened its doors on September 14, 1890. The first student to arrive was 12 years old. He and six others were enrolled on the first day, and the student body grew to 32 for the 1890–1891 school year. The first five students graduated in June 1893 with Master of Accounts degrees.

In 1898, before it was legal in Florida for black and white students to attend school together, Saint Leo enrolled a black student—Rudolph Antorcha from Cuba. Today, he and the welcoming Benedictines are honored with a sculpture titled A Spirit of Belonging, which was dedicated at University Campus in 2013.

Over the years, the school went through a series of varying focuses and name changes: St. Leo's College initially, then St. Leo Military College (1890–1903), St. Leo College (1903–17), St. Leo College Preparatory School (1917–18), Saint Leo College (1918–20), St. Leo College High School (1920–23), St. Leo Academy (1923–27), Benedictine High School (1927–29), Saint Leo College Preparatory School (1929–64), Saint Leo College (1959–99), and finally Saint Leo University (1999–present). During that time, it served as a military college within three different periods.

Saint Leo College Preparatory School operated from 1929 to 1964. In addition, Saint Leo returned to its college roots in 1959 and opened a junior college, with the first junior college graduates earning their associate degrees in 1961. The monks managed both the junior college and the prep school from 1959 to 1964. The Saint Leo College Prep School athletic teams were known as the Lions, and their colors were purple and gold. The Saint Leo College teams were known as the Monarchs, using green and gold as colors. In 1999, the Saint Leo athletic teams re-adopted the Lions name.

In 2011, Saint Leo University created an anthropomorphic lion mascot named Fritz. The name was a reference to a series Saint Bernard dogs bearing that name, all owned by Father Charles Mohr, who served as the first abbot of Saint Leo Abbey from 1902 to 1931.

The Benedictine sisters at Holy Name Monastery, its neighboring community, closed their Holy Name Academy in 1963 and assisted Saint Leo, which transitioned to a four-year program.

Saint Leo College conferred its first bachelor's degree on April 23, 1967, on 51 men and 13 women. The college was accredited by the Southern Educational Association that November, retroactive to the degree date.

In 1973, the college responded to requests from the armed services to offer degree programs on U.S. military bases. More education centers followed—on military bases, on community college campuses, and at stand-alone facilities—in seven states.

In 1998, the university's Center for Online Learning was created, allowing students to take classes online from any location. 

The university announced plans in July 2021 to merge with Marymount California University, another private Catholic university. The transition was expected to be completed by January 2023. However, plans for the merger fell through and Marymount California University plans to close in August 2022.

Since 1959, when the junior college was started, Saint Leo has had 11 presidents: 
 John I. Leonard (1959–61)
 Rev. Stephen Herrmann, OSB (1961–68) 
 Anthony W. Zaitz (1968–70)
 Rev. Marion Bowman, OSB (1970–71)
 Thomas B. Southard (1971–85)
 M. Daniel Henry (1985–87)
 Monsignor Frank M. Mouch (1987–96) 
 Arthur F. Kirk Jr. (1997–2015)
 William J. Lennox Jr. (2015–18)
 Jeffrey D. Senese (2018–2022)
 Edward Dadez (2022–present)

Awards and recognition
in the 2021 U.S. News & World Report Best Colleges rankings, Saint Leo was named #26 overall in the Regional Universities South category. The school was also named #14 Best Colleges for Veterans and #4 Best Value School in the South Region.

Saint Leo was named a 2018 Best Regional University–South and Best Value University–South by U.S. News & World Report. The school was also included in U.S. News & World Report's list of 2017 Best Online Bachelor's Programs and Best Online Bachelor's Programs for Veterans.

Saint Leo University was selected as one of the Best for Vets: Colleges 2017 by Military Times. The university was also named to the President's Higher Education Community Service Honor Roll for 2015 for measurable acts of community service by students, faculty, and staff.

In 2016, the university was named a National Center of Academic Excellence in Cyber Defense Education, a designation jointly sponsored and approved by the National Security Agency (NSA) and the Department of Homeland Security (DHS). The recognition is awarded through 2021.

Accreditation
The university is accredited by the Southern Association of Colleges and Schools Commission on Colleges to award the associate, bachelor's, master's, specialist, and doctoral degrees. The Saint Leo School of Business received initial accreditation by the International Assembly for Collegiate Business Education in September 1999. In 2014, accreditation was obtained from the Accreditation Council for Business Schools and Programs (ACBSP).

Saint Leo University's degree program in social work is accredited by the Commission on Accreditation of the Council on Social Work Education (MSW, BSW and Bridge programs). The university's undergraduate sport business program and MBA sport business concentration are accredited by the Commission on Sport Management Accreditation. The university has teacher education programs approved by the Florida Department of Education.

Student life
Students are active on campus through a variety of associations, clubs and societies, including the Computer Science Association and the International Tourism Club, LEAD scholars, Honor societies, Sociology club, Pre-Medical, Debate club and official organization of the Student Government Union. The university also has a radio station for students to take for class credit.

Student Government Union
The Student Government Union (SGU) is official student government body on the campus. It has three branches: the Student Government Union Executive Board, the Student Government Union Senate, and the Campus Activities Board. Events sponsored by the SGU have included Halloween Horror Nights at Universal Studios, campus laser tag, and a "Spring Fling" weekend featuring artists such as Lonestar, Everclear and Nick Hagelin from The Voice. The current president of the Student Government Union is Daniel Konesky.

Greek life

There are currently seven fraternities and seven sororities on campus. Greek life is an active part of campus life. Chapters must meet requirements of a certain amount of social activities, educational programs, and philanthropy/community service each year. First-year students may sign up for recruitment to join a Greek organization during their first semester, but they must maintain a 2.7 minimum GPA per semester to stay apart of the chapter. The undergraduate chapters are only on the University Campus, but graduate students at learning centers may be able to join NPHC graduate chapters if their local area has them.

Athletics

Saint Leo University's athletic teams are known as the Lions. They participate as a member of the National Collegiate Athletic Association's Division II in the Sunshine State Conference (SSC). Men's sports include baseball, basketball, cross country, golf, lacrosse, soccer, swimming, tennis and distance track; women's sports include basketball, cross country, golf, lacrosse, soccer, softball, swimming, tennis, distance track, volleyball and beach volleyball. The university plans to add acrobatics and tumbling in 2019. The school won its first NCAA Division II National Title in 2016 when the Lions' men's golf team defeated Chico State, 3–2, in the NCAA DII Championship round at Green Valley Ranch Golf Club in Denver, Colorado as part of the 2016 NCAA Division II Spring Championships Festival. Saint Leo also played host to the 2016 NCAA Division II Cross Country Championships at The Abbey Course.

Notable alumni and attendees

Saint Leo University has produced thousands of alumni over the years, including Charles Henri Baker, a Haitian industrialist and presidential candidate; politicians Richard Corcoran and Ed Narain; George N. Turner, former Atlanta chief of police; musicians Stephen Stills and Desi Arnaz; Major League Baseball executive J. P. Ricciardi; Academy Award-winning actor Lee Marvin; and Major League Baseball player Bob Tewksbury.

WLSL-LP FM 92.7

In January 2014 Saint Leo University received a construction permit for a Low Power FM Station to operate on 92.7 MHz. The call sign is WLSL-LP (We Love Saint Leo).

The station's studio facilities are located on University Campus with the transmitter and antenna facilities located at Pasco High School in Dade City. WLSL-LP covers the communities of Saint Leo, Dade City, and San Antonio and can be heard in a car radio as far north as Ridge Manor and south of Zephyrhills. The station was fully licensed on October 19, 2015.

References

External links
 
 Official athletics website

 
Educational institutions established in 1889
Universities and colleges accredited by the Southern Association of Colleges and Schools
Benedictine colleges and universities
Buildings and structures in Pasco County, Florida
Education in Pasco County, Florida
1889 establishments in Florida
Catholic universities and colleges in Florida
Roman Catholic Diocese of Saint Petersburg